Lucas Sena Silva (born 31 January 2001), known as Lucas Sena, is a Brazilian footballer who plays for Atlético Catarinense, on loan from Santos. Mainly a left back, he can also play as a forward.

Club career
Born in São Paulo, Sena joined Santos' youth setup in 2011, aged ten. On 17 May 2018, he signed his first professional contract with the club, agreeing to a three-year deal.

On 14 February 2020, Sena agreed to a new contract with the club, running until 2023. On 21 July, he was registered for the year's Campeonato Paulista.

Sena subsequently played for Santos' B-team and moved out on loan to Rio Branco-PR for the 2022 Campeonato Paranaense on 30 November 2021. He made his professional debut on 27 January 2022, starting in a 1–2 away loss against Cianorte.

Sena returned to Peixe when his loan expired, but was not included in the first team squad. On 15 February 2023, he moved to Atlético Catarinense on loan until the end of the 2023 Campeonato Catarinense.

Career statistics

References

External links

2001 births
Living people
Footballers from São Paulo
Brazilian footballers
Association football defenders
Campeonato Paranaense players
Santos FC players
Rio Branco Sport Club players